Phellinus noxius is a plant pathogen.

References

External links

Fungal plant pathogens and diseases
noxius
Fungi described in 1932